Pablo Daniel Pereira Coitiño (born January 30, 1986 in Montevideo, Uruguay), better known as Pablo Pereira, is a Uruguayan footballer who plays for the Rampla Juniors.

Career
After a spell in Chile with Rangers de Talca, Pereira returned to Uruguay and re-joined Rampla Juniors in February 2020. In the summer 2020, he then moved to Colón FC. At the end of March 2021, he once again returned to Rampla Juniors.

References

External links

 (with wrong birthday)

1986 births
Living people
Uruguayan footballers
Uruguayan expatriate footballers
Villa Española players
C.D. Arturo Fernández Vial footballers
Rampla Juniors players
C.A. Progreso players
Club Deportivo Palestino footballers
Sport Club do Recife players
Esporte Clube Vitória players
El Tanque Sisley players
Atenas de San Carlos players
Unión Temuco footballers
Deportes La Serena footballers
Central Español players
Juventud Unida de Gualeguaychú players
L.D.U. Portoviejo footballers
Rangers de Talca footballers
Colón F.C. players
Chilean Primera División players
Primera B de Chile players
Campeonato Brasileiro Série B players
Uruguayan Primera División players
Uruguayan Segunda División players
Primera Nacional players
Liga Nacional de Fútbol de Guatemala players
Ecuadorian Serie B players
Association football forwards
Uruguayan expatriate sportspeople in Brazil
Uruguayan expatriate sportspeople in Chile
Uruguayan expatriate sportspeople in Guatemala
Uruguayan expatriate sportspeople in Ecuador
Expatriate footballers in Brazil
Expatriate footballers in Chile
Expatriate footballers in Guatemala
Expatriate footballers in Ecuador